This article covers the phonology of the Orsmaal-Gussenhoven dialect, a variety of Getelands (a transitional dialect between South Brabantian and West Limburgish) spoken in Orsmaal-Gussenhoven, a village in the Linter municipality.

Consonants

Obstruents
In the case of the fricatives, the same is true of the  pair, though  is a non-native phoneme that occurs only in the word-initial position. In the intervocalic position, they are completely voiceless.
 are bilabial, whereas  are labiodental.
 are velar.
The exact place of articulation of  varies:
Word-initial  is restricted to the sequence .
 may be dropped by some speakers.
In the case of stops, it occurs in pre-pausal position, where voiced fricatives are banned.

Sonorants
 are alveolar.
 before  is pronounced as follows:
, if  belongs to another morpheme (alveolo-palatal  before allomorphemic );
, if  belongs to the same morpheme.
Word-final  appears only in loanwords from French.
 tends to be velarized, especially postvocalically.
 has a few possible realizations:
Apical trill  or an apical fricative  before a stressed vowel in word-initial syllables.
Intervocalically and in the onset after a consonant, it may be a tap .
Word-final  is highly variable; the most frequent variants are an apical fricative trill , an apical fricative  and an apical non-sibilant affricate . The last two variants tend to be voiceless in pre-pausal position.
 is velar, whereas  is palatal.
 appear only word-initially and intervocalically.

Final devoicing and assimilation
Just like Standard Dutch, Orsmaal-Gussenhoven dialect devoices all obstruents at the ends of words.

Morpheme-final  may be voiced if a voiced plosive or a vowel follows.

Vowels

The vowel system of the Orsmaal-Gussenhoven dialect is considerably richer than that of Standard Dutch.

Brabantian dialects are known for both diphthongizing  (much as in Northern Standard Dutch) and especially monophthongizing . Because of that, the distinction between the closing diphthongs and the monophthongs is ignored elsewhere in the article, with  being used as cover symbols for both.
  occurs only before alveolar consonants.
 All long front unrounded vowels contrast with centering diphthongs, so that   'ten',   'beer' and   'May' contrast with   'toe',   'bear' and   'march'. The fact that this contrast occurs even before  is remarkable from the Standard Dutch viewpoint, where only centering diphthongs can occur in that environment.
 Stressed short vowels cannot occur in open syllables. Exceptions to this rule are high-frequency words like   'what' and loanwords from French.

Phonetic realization
 Most of the long vowels are close to the canonical values of the corresponding IPA symbols. The short open vowels have the same quality, and the open  are phonological back vowels despite the symbolization.
 Among the long rounded vowels,  before  within the same syllable vary between monophthongs  and centering diphthongs , which often are disyllabic  (with the first portion realized as a closing diphthong). In the same environment,  can be disyllabic . For the sake of simplicity, those allophones are transcribed  in phonetic transcription.
 The short mid front vowels are rather closer than their phonemic long counterparts and considerably higher than the short back vowels of the same phonemic height, so that  approach  in articulation: .
 Among the short back vowels,  approaches  in articulation: , whereas  is both more open and more central than : , being of the same height as the phonemically open-mid . The phonetically near-open  has no real phonetic front counterpart, as the open  is phonetically central.
In addition,  differs from (Northern) Standard Dutch  in that it has an unrounded, central onset, rather than a rounded, centralized back one. In Belgian Standard Dutch, the corresponding vowel is monophthongal .
 The quality of the remaining diphthongs  is close to the canonical values of the IPA symbols used to transcribe them.

Differences in transcription of the back vowels
The differences are listed below:

The way those vowels are transcribed in this article reflects how they are typically transcribed in IPA transcriptions of Dutch dialects, especially Limburgish.

Prosody
Stress location is largely the same as in Belgian Standard Dutch. In loanwords from French, the original word-final stress is often preserved, as in   'cadeau'.

Sample
The sample text is a reading of the first sentence of The North Wind and the Sun. The orthographic version is written in Standard Dutch.

Phonetic transcription

Orthographic version (Eye dialect)

Orthographic version (Standard Dutch)

References

Bibliography

 
 
 
 

Germanic phonologies